Alexander Melchor Pacheco Lara (born July 19, 1973) is a former pitcher in Major League Baseball who played for the Montreal Expos in its 1996 season. Listed at 6' 3" , 200 lb. , Pacheco batted and threw right handed. He was born in Caracas, Venezuela.

Career
The Expos signed Pacheco as an amateur free agent in 1989. Pacheco made his debut with the Gulf Coast League Expos in 1990, spending six seasons in the Montreal Minor League system, where he was mostly used as a long reliever and spot starter, until he joined the big team in April 1996. In five relief appearances for the Expos, Pacheco posted an 11.12 ERA and did not have a decision or save, giving up seven earned runs on eight hits and one walk while striking out seven in 5⅔ innings of work.

Pacheco spent the remainder of the 1996 season with the Harrisburg Senators. Late in the year, he was sent along with Jeff Fassero to the Seattle Mariners for Trey Moore, Matt Wagner and Chris Widger. Pacheco spent 1997 in the Mariners' organization, and later pitched for the Tampa Bay Devil Rays and New York Yankees Triple A teams in a span of three seasons from 1998 to 2002.

In between, Pacheco played winter ball for four clubs of the Venezuelan League during 13 seasons between 1989 and 2002, as well as for the Pericos de Puebla of the Mexican League in 2000 and 2002–2003.

Overall, Pacheco had a 50–54 record with a 4.34 ERA and 55 saves at six different levels, along with 649 strikeouts and 348 walks in 713⅓ innings.

After his playing retirement, Pacheco became a coach in the Venezuelan League.

Sources

See also
 List of players from Venezuela in Major League Baseball
 Montreal Expos all-time roster

External links

Pelota Binaria
Retrosheet

1973 births
Living people
Burlington Bees players
Cardenales de Lara players
Caribes de Oriente players
Columbus Clippers players
Durham Bulls players
Gulf Coast Expos players
Harrisburg Senators players
Jamestown Expos players
Leones del Caracas players
Major League Baseball pitchers
Major League Baseball players from Venezuela
Memphis Chicks players
Minor league baseball coaches
Montreal Expos players
Navegantes del Magallanes players
Norwich Navigators players
Ottawa Lynx players
Pericos de Puebla players
Baseball players from Caracas
Tacoma Rainiers players
Venezuelan baseball coaches
Venezuelan expatriate baseball players in Canada
Venezuelan expatriate baseball players in Mexico
Venezuelan expatriate baseball players in the United States
West Palm Beach Expos players